

Yanyarrie is a locality in the Australian state of South Australia located on the eastern side of the Flinders Ranges about  north of the state capital of Adelaide and about and  north of the municipal seat of Orroroo.

The locality’s boundaries were created on 16 December 1999 for the “local established name” which is derived from the cadastral unit of the Hundred of Yanyarrie whose northern side is occupied by the locality and ultimately from an aboriginal word meaning “Kangaroo Urine”.

Land use within the locality is ’primary production’ and is concerned with “agricultural production and the grazing of stock on relatively large holdings.”

The 2016 Australian census which was conducted in August 2016 reports that Yanyarrie had a population of 5 people.

Yanyarrie is located within the federal division of Grey, the state Stuart, and the local government area of the District Council of Orroroo Carrieton.

References

Towns in South Australia